The 2008–09 Cincinnati Bearcats men's basketball team represented the University of Cincinnati during the 2008–09 NCAA Division I men's basketball season. The team played its home games in Cincinnati, Ohio at the Fifth Third Arena, which has a capacity of 13,176. They are members of the Big East Conference. The Bearcats finished the season 18–14, 8–10 in Big East play and were upset in the first round of the 2009 Big East men's basketball tournament by the 16th seed DePaul.

Offseason

Departing players

Incoming Transfers

Recruiting class of 2008

Recruiting class of 2009

Roster

Depth chart

Source

Schedule and results

|-
!colspan=12 style=|Exhibition

|-
!colspan=12 style=|Non-Conference Regular Season

|-
!colspan=12 style=|Big East Regular Season

|-
!colspan=12 style=|Big East tournament 

Source

Awards and milestones

Big East Conference honors

All-Big East Third Team 
 Deonta Vaughn

Big East All-Rookie Team 
 Yancy Gates

Source

Rankings

References

Cincinnati
Cincinnati Bearcats men's basketball seasons
Cincinnati Bearcats men's basketball
Cincinnati Bearcats men's basketball